Lifeline is the fourth EP and eighth overall release by Jesu. It was released on CD on 4 October 2007 in Japan, and 23 October 2007 in America. In 2009, popular music publication Pitchfork Media cited "Lifeline" as "the best non-collaborative release in Broadrick's unwieldy discography."

Track listing
"Lifeline" - 5:17
"You Wear Their Masks" - 6:18
"Storm Comin' On" - 5:58
"End of the Road" - 5:34
"Lifeline" (Alternate Version) - 5:23 †
"Decide" (Alternate Version of "Storm Comin' On") - 5:54 †

† indicates a track exclusive to the Japanese edition of the album.

Personnel
Justin Broadrick – guitars/vocals/programming
Diarmuid Dalton – bowed bass guitar ("Storm Comin' On")
Ted Parsons - drums ("Storm Comin' On")
Jarboe - vocals ("Storm Comin' On")

References

Jesu (band) albums
2007 EPs
Post-metal EPs
Albums with cover art by Aaron Turner
Hydra Head Records EPs